Lesney Products & Co v Nolan [1976] EWCA Civ 8 is a UK labour law case concerning redundancy.

Facts
Lesney Products & Co removed its night shift and divided its day shift into two. The company still produced the same amount of products (even though demand had fallen) but it was no longer giving overtime to its workers. Employees who saw their wages drop by a third refused to work on the new day shift. They were dismissed and they claimed redundancy.

The Tribunal upheld the employees' claim.

Judgment
Lord Denning MR said that the employees were not redundant, because the employer had a legitimate business reason for wishing to vary the contracts, and the employees' non-acceptance effectively amounted to a voluntary resignation.

Stephenson LJ and Shaw LJ concurred.

See also

UK labour law
Unfair dismissal

Notes

References

United Kingdom labour case law
1977 in British law
1977 in case law
Court of Appeal (England and Wales) cases